Tom Blackburn FBPharmacolS, FRSB (born 1949) is a British industrial pharmacologist.

Blackburn studied at both the University of Nottingham and Manchester University, and worked as a senior manager at ICI Pharmaceuticals, Beecham Pharmaceuticals SmithKline Beecham, Synaptic Pharmaceutical Corporation and Helicon Therapeutics.

He is the author of over 100 scientific papers, reviews and book chapters and holds over 20 patents. He is President Emeritus of the British Pharmacological Society and is a member of the American College of Neuropsychopharmacology.

He was elected an Honorary Fellow of the British Pharmacological Society (Hon FBPharmacolS) in 2014 and is a Fellow of the Royal Society of Biology (FRSB).

References

External links 

 
  - conducted by Professor Tilli Tansey, for the History of Modern Biomedicine Research Group, 22 February 2016 (seven parts)

1949 births
Place of birth missing (living people)
Living people
British pharmacologists
Fellows of the Royal Society of Biology
Honorary Fellows of the British Pharmacological Society